Wayne Township is one of the thirteen townships of Clinton County, Ohio, United States. As of the 2010 census the population was 716; only Wilson Township has a lower population in Clinton County.

Geography
Located in the eastern part of the county, it borders the following townships:
Richland Township - north
Concord Township, Fayette County - northeast
Green Township, Fayette County - east
Fairfield Township, Highland County - southeast
Green Township - southwest
Union Township - west corner

No municipalities are located in Wayne Township, although the unincorporated community of Lees Creek lies in the township's center.

Name and history
Named in honor of General "Mad Anthony" Wayne, it is one of twenty Wayne Townships statewide.

Wayne Township was erected in 1837 by the Clinton County Commissioners from parts of Green and Richland townships.

Transportation
Major roads in Wayne Township are State Routes 72 and 729.

Government
The township is governed by a three-member board of trustees, who are elected in November of odd-numbered years to a four-year term beginning on the following January 1. Two are elected in the year after the presidential election and one is elected in the year before it. There is also an elected township fiscal officer, who serves a four-year term beginning on April 1 of the year after the election, which is held in November of the year before the presidential election. Vacancies in the fiscal officership or on the board of trustees are filled by the remaining trustees.

Currently, the board is composed of Kevin Bean, Carl Hughes, and Steve Kenney.

References
Clinton County Historical Society.  Clinton County, Ohio, 1982.  Wilmington, Ohio:  The Society, 1982.
Ohio Atlas & Gazetteer.  6th ed. Yarmouth, Maine:  DeLorme, 2001.  
Ohio. Secretary of State.  The Ohio municipal and township roster, 2002-2003.  Columbus, Ohio:  The Secretary, 2003.

External links
County website

Townships in Clinton County, Ohio
Townships in Ohio
1837 establishments in Ohio
Populated places established in 1837